John Abraham Page (10 February 1893 – 1964) was an English professional footballer who played as a winger for Sunderland.

References

1893 births
1964 deaths
Footballers from Sunderland
English footballers
Association football wingers
Sunderland West End F.C. players
Sunderland A.F.C. players
English Football League players
Date of death missing